Friedrich Wilhelm August Mullach (1807–1882) was a German philologist and Byzantine scholar.

Life
He was born on January 1, 1807, in Berlin. He taught history and philology at Berlin University. He died on June 8, 1882, in Berlin.

Legacy
His Fragments of the Greek Philosophers was the first comprehensive collection of the Pre-Socratics. His Grammar of the Greek Vernacular was the standard late 19th-century work on the development of modern Greek. However, Nietzsche, who argued that Democritus's legitimate works should be limited to The Great Diacosmos and On the Nature of the Cosmos, the only two considered genuine by the Byzantine Suda, felt Mullach was "a negligent blockhead".

Works
Mullach is best remembered for his Fragmenta Philosophorum Graecorum (Fragments of the Greek Philosophers), published by the Didots at Paris between 1860 and 1881.

He also wrote or edited:

 . 
 . 
 . 
 . 
 ; 2nd ed., 1860. 
 . 
 . 
 . 
 . 
 . 
 .  &

References

External links

1807 births
1882 deaths